Klebold (/ˈkliːboʊld/) is a surname.  Notable people with the surname include:

 Dylan Bennet Klebold (19811999), American mass murderer (Columbine High School massacre)
 Sue Klebold (born 1949), American author and social activist; mother of Dylan Klebold